Laura M. Roth is an American solid state physicist, and an American Physical Society Fellow.

Career 

Around 1960, Roth was working at the MIT Lincoln Laboratory, and along with Mildred Dresselhaus, she was one of only two women among approximately 1000 men. Around this time she was also encouraged and mentored by Benjamin Lax. She has also co-authored papers with Kenneth Button.

Roth became an American Physical Society Fellow in 1967, while at Tufts University.

She is currently Emerita Professor at Department of Physics, University at Albany.

Selected publications

Books

References

External links 
 Search for publications listed on Google Scholar

American physicists
American women physicists
20th-century women scientists
Massachusetts Institute of Technology alumni
Tufts University faculty
University at Albany, SUNY faculty
Fellows of the American Physical Society
Living people
Year of birth missing (living people)
American women academics
21st-century American women